Daiken may refer to

Leslie Daiken (1912–1964), Irish-Jewish advertising copywriter, poet, and editor, formerly Yodaiken 
Melanie Ruth Daiken (1945–2016), English composer and musician
Daiken, a High School Equivalency Test in Japan
 Daiken Company Limited, a Japanese company of the Second World War, now Itochu